Logania malayica, the Malayan mottle, is a butterfly in the family Lycaenidae. It was described by William Lucas Distant in 1884. It is found in the Indomalayan realm.

Subspecies
 L. m. malayica Thailand, Malay Peninsula, Borneo, Sumatra
 L. m. subura Fruhstorfer, 1914 Philippines

Biology
The larva is associated with the aphid genus Pseudoregma.

References

External links

Logania at Markku Savela's Lepidoptera and Some Other Life Forms

Logania (butterfly)
Butterflies described in 1884